Blit may refer to:

 Bit blit (BITBLT), a computer operation in which two bitmap patterns are combined
 Blit (computer terminal), a programmable bitmap graphics terminal
 "BLIT" (short story), by David Langford
 The Blit dialect of the Cotabato Manobo language
 Toyota Mark II Blit, a car

See also 

 BLITS